Jiří Louda (3 October 1920 – 1 September 2015) was a Czech heraldist and veteran of World War II. Louda was considered among the leading coats of arms designers in the Czech Republic and the former Czechoslovakia. He designed the current coat of arms of the Czech Republic, adopted in 1992, which incorporates the displays of the three historic Czech lands. Louda also designed the standard (official presidential flag) of President of the Czech Republic, which was adopted in 1993 following the country's independence. Additionally, Louda created coat of arms of the Olomouc Region, as well as the municipal coats of arms for more than 200 towns and cities throughout the Czech Republic.

Louda was born in Kutná Hora, Czechoslovakia, on 3 October 1920. He fled to the United Kingdom during World War II and the Nazi occupation of Czechoslovakia, where the Czechoslovak government-in-exile was headquartered. He joined the exiled Czechoslovakian military during World War II and served as a paratrooper.

He was imprisoned by the Czechoslovakia's Communist regime during the late 1940s. Louda was released from prison in 1950.

He is best known in the English-speaking world to students of royal and noble genealogies and royal families as co-author with Michael Maclagan (who wrote the text, while Louda compiled and drew the tables) of the best-selling Lines of Succession, first published in 1981, and subsequently reprinted and revised on several occasions.

Jiří Louda died in Olomouc on 1 September 2015, at the age of 94.

Publications
 With Michael Maclagan. Lines of Succession: Heraldry of the Royal Families of Europe. London: Orbis & New York: Clarkson Potter, 1981; revised and updated edition, 1991; adapted small-format edition, 2002. (The 1981 American edition was published as Heraldry of the Royal Families of Europe, but later editions took the European title.)

References

1920 births
2015 deaths
Heraldists
Coats of arms designers
Flag designers
Heraldic artists
Recipients of Medal of Merit (Czech Republic)
Recipients of the Czechoslovak War Cross
Czech coats of arms
Czechoslovak military personnel of World War II
Czechoslovak exiles
People from Kutná Hora